Thittai or Thengudi Thittai is a village in the Thanjavur taluk of Thanjavur district, Tamil Nadu, India.This village is known for its Vasishteswarar Temple, Thittai.

Demographics

As per the 2001 census, Thittai had a total population of 1105 with 544 males and 561 females. The sex ratio was 1031. The literacy rate was 75.32.

References

 

Villages in Thanjavur district